Louisiana's 2nd congressional district contains nearly all of the city of New Orleans and stretches west and north to Baton Rouge. The district is currently represented by Democrat Troy Carter. With a Cook Partisan Voting Index rating of D+25, it is the only Democratic district in Louisiana.

History

Louisiana gained a second district in 1823 as part of the 18th United States Congress. At first it comprised New Orleans and significant populations from surrounding areas. With the growth of population in the urban area, the current district is located mostly within the city of New Orleans. 

Since the late 19th century, this has been historically among the most safely Democratic seats in the country, for sharply opposing reasons. During Reconstruction, most African Americans affiliated with the Republican Party and, as a majority, elected Republicans from this district. 

White Democrats regained control of the district in 1891, when voter suppression of Republicans was rampant. In 1898 the Democratic-dominated state legislature had disenfranchised most blacks in the state through provisions of a new state constitution that raised barriers to voter registration, such as poll taxes and subjective literacy tests. The Democrats had maintained the political exclusion of blacks for decades. Like most congressional districts in the South, this district consistently voted Democratic from the late 19th century until the late 1960s, because the voters during that time were nearly all white Democrats. Such Democrats created what was known as the Solid South in Congress, exercising power beyond their proportion of the electorate.

From the 1960s onward, however, white conservatives began splitting their tickets and voting Republican, gradually switching outright to the GOP. At the same time, black voters regained the franchise and lent their support to Democrats. Since 1984, the district has been drawn as a black-majority district.

In 2008, after a federal grand jury indicted nine-term incumbent congressman William J. Jefferson on sixteen felony charges related to corruption the year prior, Joseph Cao was elected as the first Republican to represent the 2nd congressional district and most of New Orleans in more than a century. Cao was the first Vietnamese-American U.S. Representative elected in the country. He was the only Republican in the 111th Congress to represent a district with a predominantly African-American population. Cao was heavily defeated in 2010 by state representative Cedric Richmond, and the district reverted to its Democratic ways. Richmond defeated nominal Republican challengers in 2012 and 2020, and no Republican even filed from 2014 to 2018.

For most of the period from 1983 to 2013, this district contained nearly all of the city of New Orleans (except for a small portion located in the neighboring ), and some of its suburbs.  In 2003, it was pushed into the West Bank portion of Jefferson Parish and South Kenner, which have a higher proportion of white residents.  After the 2010 census, the legislature pushed the 2nd slightly to the west, picking up a portion of Baton Rouge–essentially, most of the capital's majority-black precincts.

Recent presidential elections

List of members representing the district

Recent election results

2002

2004

2006

2008

2010

2012

2014

2016

2018

2020

2021 (special)

2022

See also

Louisiana's congressional districts
List of United States congressional districts

References

 Congressional Biographical Directory of the United States 1774–present

02
Jefferson Parish, Louisiana
Orleans Parish, Louisiana